Branchiostegus biendong is a species of marine ray-finned fish, a tilefish belonging to the family Malacanthidae. It is found in Vietnam.

References

Malacanthidae
Taxa named by Wataru Hiramatsu
Taxa named by Chu Tien Vinh
Taxa named by Hiromitsu Endo
Fish described in 2019